Kumiko Ogihara is a Japanese male curler and coach.

Record as a coach of national teams

References

External links

Living people
Japanese male curlers
Japanese curling coaches
Year of birth missing (living people)